The Cincinnati Subdivision is a railroad line owned by CSX Transportation in the U.S. State of Kentucky. At its east end the line junctions with the Northern Subdivision, and at its west end the line continues as a branch of the Cincinnati Terminal Subdivision.

See also
 List of CSX Transportation lines

References

Transportation in Greenup County, Kentucky
Transportation in Campbell County, Kentucky